Antonio Mirabal (born 1910), sometimes listed as "Autorio", was a Cuban outfielder in the Negro leagues between 1934 and 1940.

A native of Bauta, Cuba, Mirabal made his Negro leagues debut in 1934 with the Cuban Stars (East). He went on to play for the New York Cubans in parts of three seasons through 1940.

References

External links
 and Baseball-Reference Black Baseball stats and Seamheads

1910 births
Date of birth missing
Possibly living people
Cuban Stars (East) players
New York Cubans players
People from Bauta, Cuba
Cuban baseball players
Baseball outfielders